Manfred Spitzer (born May 27, 1958) is a German neuroscientist, psychiatrist and author.

Life 
Manfred Spitzer was born on May 27, 1958 in Lengfeld, Darmstadt, Hesse, Germany. After his Abitur at the Max-Planck-Gymnasium in Groß-Umstadt, he studied medicine, philosophy and psychology at the University of Freiburg. During this time he earned his money for living as a street musician among other professions. Spitzer is the publisher of the trade journal Nervenheilkunde and a member of the Board of Trustees of the Stiftung Louisenlund. He has a controversial opinion on smartphones, saying that they make children "krank" ("ill"), "dumm" ("stupid") and "süchtig" ("addicted") and should only be allowed without supervision at age 18 and up. Some scientists disagree with that and say that these devices are very important in today's world and can be very useful and children have to learn how to use them right as early as possible.

He has five children, including Thomas Spitzer.

Awards 
1992: DGPPN-Duphar-Forschungsförderpreis of the Deutsche Gesellschaft für Psychiatrie und Psychotherapie, Psychosomatik und Nervenheilkunde
2002: Cogito-Preis of the Cogito Foundation

Works (selection) 
 Halluzinationen. Ein Beitrag zur allgemeinen und klinischen Psychopathologie. Springer, Berlin 1988, .
 Was ist Wahn? Untersuchungen zum Wahnproblem. Springer, Berlin 1989, .
 Geist im Netz. 1996.
 with Leo Hermele: Von der Degeneration zur Antizipation – Gedanken zur nicht-Mendelschen Vererbung neuropsychiatrischer Erkrankungen aus historischer und aktueller Sicht. In: Gerhardt Nissen, Frank Badura (Hrsg.): Schriftenreihe der Deutschen Gesellschaft für Geschichte der Nervenheilkunde. Band 2. Würzburg 1996, S. 111–127.
 Ketchup und das kollektive Unbewusste. Geschichten aus der Nervenheilkunde. Schattauer, Stuttgart 2001, .
 Lernen. Gehirnforschung und die Schule des Lebens., 2002, .
 Musik im Kopf: Hören, Musizieren, Verstehen und Erleben im neuronalen Netzwerk. 2002.
 Selbstbestimmen. Gehirnforschung und die Frage: Was sollen wir tun? 2004.
 Frontalhirn an Mandelkern. Letzte Meldungen aus der Nervenheilkunde. 2005.
 Vorsicht Bildschirm! Elektronische Medien, Gehirnentwicklung, Gesundheit und Gesellschaft. Klett, Stuttgart 2005, .
 Gott-Gen und Grossmutterneuron. Geschichten von Gehirnforschung und Gesellschaft. 2006.
 Mozarts Geistesblitze. Wie unser Gehirn Musik verarbeitet. 2006.
 Vom Sinn des Lebens. Wege statt Werke. Schattauer, Stuttgart 2007, .
 Liebesbriefe und Einkaufszentren. Meditationen im und über den Kopf. Schattauer Verlag, 2008, .
 Medizin für die Bildung. Ein Weg aus der Krise. 2010, .
 Wie Kinder denken lernen 2010, . (4 Hörbücher, 300 min.)
 Wie Erwachsene denken und lernen. 2011, . (3 Hörbücher, 210 min.)
 Nichtstun, Flirten, Küssen und andere Leistungen des Gehirns. Schattauer Verlag, 2011, .
 Digitale Demenz. Wie wir uns und unsere Kinder um den Verstand bringen. Droemer Knaur, München 2012, . (Rank #1 of Spiegel's bestseller list from August 27, 2012 to September 9, 2012)
 as publisher: Heinz Janisch, Carola Holland: Tom und der König der Tiere (= Leben Lernen. 1). 2012, .
 as publisher: Heinz Janisch, Susanne Wechdorn: Mein Freund, der Rasenmäher (= Leben Lernen). 2012, .
 Das (un)soziale Gehirn. Schattauer, Stuttgart 2013, .
 Rotkäppchen und der Stress. Schattauer, Stuttgart 2014, .
 Cyberkrank! Wie das digitalisierte Leben unsere Gesundheit ruiniert. Droemer, München 2015, .
 Früher war alles später. Schattauer, Stuttgart 2017, .
 Einsamkeit. Die unerkannte Krankheit. Schmerzhaft. Ansteckend. Tödlich. Droemer, München 2018, .
 Die Smartphone-Epidemie. Gefahren für Gesundheit, Bildung und Gesellschaft. Klett-Cotta, Stuttgart 2018, .

References

External links

 
 Manfred Spitzer on IMDb

1958 births
German male writers
Living people
German neuroscientists